Rado or Radó may refer to:

Given name
Rado (died 617), Burgundian palace mayor
Rado (died 1057), Hungarian noble

Surname
Alexander Radó (1899–1981), Hungarian-born cartographer and Soviet military intelligence agent
Elisabeth Radó (1899–1986), Yugoslavian opera singer
Tibor Radó (1895–1965), Hungarian mathematician
Sándor Radó (psychoanalyst) (1890–1972), Hungarian-American psychoanalyst
Christian Rado (born 1975), American racing driver
Gaby Rado (1955–2003), Hungarian-born British television journalist
James Rado (1932–2022), American actor
Jonathan Rado, American musician and producer
Richard Rado (1906–1989), German mathematician
Türkan Rado (1915–2007), first ever Turkish female professor of jurisprudence

Business
 Rado watches, a brand of the Swatch Group of Switzerland

See also